Computer Science and Computer Sciences can refer to:
 The general field of computer science
 Computer Sciences Corporation, the predecessor of DXC Technology
 Computer Science (journal), a peer-reviewed scientific journal
 Computer Science (UIL), a University Interscholastic League academic event